Robert Bruce St. Clair (February 18, 1931 – April 20, 2015) was an American professional football player who was a tackle for the San Francisco 49ers of the National Football League (NFL). Because of his eccentricities, his teammates nicknamed him "The Geek".

St. Clair may be the only player in NFL history to have spent nearly all of his entire playing career in the same city, playing in the same stadium at all levels. St. Clair attended San Francisco's Polytechnic High School (located across the street from the stadium) and the University of San Francisco, and was part of USF's undefeated 1951 team. After USF dropped football, St. Clair finished his college career at the University of Tulsa. He was then drafted by the 49ers in the 1953 NFL Draft and played his entire professional career in San Francisco until his retirement prior to the 1964 season. Per NFL Hall of Fame archives, St. Clair is credited with blocking 10 field goals in 1956.

In 2001, as a tribute for playing a total of 17 seasons and 189 home games at Kezar Stadium, the city of San Francisco renamed the stadium's field in honor of St. Clair. He was elected to the Pro Football Hall of Fame in 1990.

While still an active player, St. Clair was elected to Daly City's city council in 1958, which included a term as mayor from 1961 to 1962; one of his mayoral and council colleagues was his high school coach Joe Verducci. He was the county supervisor for San Mateo County from 1966 to 1974. For many years he owned a liquor store at 24th and Sanchez in Noe Valley, which still bears his name. The store is at 3900 24th Street.

During St. Clair's tenure as mayor, the Philadelphia Warriors of the National Basketball Association moved to the Cow Palace in Daly City and became the San Francisco Warriors. The team moved to the Oakland Coliseum Arena in 1971 and took its current name, the Golden State Warriors. The Warriors won games 2 and 3 of the 1975 NBA World Championship Series at the Cow Palace en route to a four-game sweep of the Washington Bullets.

St. Clair broke his hip in February 2015; complications led to his death in Santa Rosa, California on April 20, 2015 at the age of 84.

References

External links
 

1931 births
2015 deaths
Alcohol distribution retailers
County supervisors in California
Pro Football Hall of Fame inductees
American football offensive tackles
San Francisco 49ers players
Western Conference Pro Bowl players
San Francisco Dons football players
Tulsa Golden Hurricane football players
Mayors of places in California
National Football League players with retired numbers
American athlete-politicians
People from Daly City, California
Players of American football from San Francisco